An American Idol Christmas (also titled A Very Idol Christmas in Canada) is a Christmas television special for the television shows American Idol, American Juniors and Canadian Idol, but focused mostly on American Idol– the Canadian winner Ryan Malcolm was edited out in the American release, due to legal reasons. The special was broadcast on the Fox television network in the United States and CTV in Canada. It was first broadcast on November 25, 2003 in the United States. It featured some of the top finalists of American Idol's first season (Kelly Clarkson, Tamyra Gray, Christina Christian) and second season (Ruben Studdard, Clay Aiken, Kimberley Locke); Canadian Idol winner Ryan Malcolm (not shown in American version due to the upcoming World Idol); and the American Juniors. Since the episode was not a competition, none of the judges appeared because they were working on the next season's contestants. It was directed by Bruce Gowers, produced by 19 Entertainment, Fremantle Media North America, Cécile Frot-Coutaz, Simon Fuller, David Goffin, Nigel Lythgoe and Ken Warwick.

Songs performed

 "Blue Christmas"
Ruben Studdard
 "Perfect Christmas"
American Juniors
 "Have Yourself a Merry Little Christmas"
Ruben Studdard & Tamyra Gray
 "Grown Up Christmas List"
Kelly Clarkson

American Idol
Christmas television specials
Canadian Idol
Television shows directed by Bruce Gowers